Grenville may refer to:

People

British Prime Ministers
 George Grenville (1712–1770), Prime Minister 1763–1765
 William Grenville, 1st Baron Grenville (1759–1834), his son, Prime Minister 1806–1807

Other people
 Anne Grenville, Baroness Grenville (1772–1864), English noblewoman and author
 Bevil Grenville (1596–1643), English soldier
 Bruce Grenville (Bruce Ronald Henderson, born 1950), New Zealand anarchist and hoaxer
 Elizabeth Grenville (1719–1769), British artist and writer
 George Grenville (disambiguation)
 Georgina Grenville (born 1975), South African fashion model
 Henry Grenville (1717–1784), British diplomat and politician
 Hester Grenville, 1st Countess Temple, (c. 1690 – 1752)
 Honor Grenville, Viscountess Lisle, (c. 1493–5 – 1566)
 Kate Grenville (born 1950), Australian author
 James Grenville (1715–1783), British politician
 James Grenville, 1st Baron Glastonbury (1742–1825), British politician
 Jane Grenville (born 1958), British archaeologist and academic
 John Grenville (disambiguation) 
 Richard Grenville (disambiguation)
 Richard Temple-Nugent-Brydges-Chandos-Grenville (disambiguation)
 Thomas Grenville (disambiguation)

People with the given name Grenville
Grenville Anderson (1951–2004), Australian auto racing driver
Grenville Astill, British archaeology at the University of Reading
Grenville Beardsley (1898–1960), American lawyer, Attorney General of Illinois
Grenville Berkeley (1806–1896), British politician
Grenville Booth (1925 –1990) English footballer
Grenville Clark (1882–1967) American lawyer and author
Grenville Cole (1859–1924), British geologist
Grenville Cross (born 1951), British barrister
Grenville Davey (born 1961), English sculptor
Grenville Dietrich (born 1960), retired Australian Rules football player
Grenville M. Dodge (1831–1916), American  Civil War officer and congressman
Grenville C. Emery (born 1843) American educator and author, founder of Harvard-Westlake School
Grenville T. Emmet (1877–1937), American lawyer and diplomat
Grenville Goodwin (c. 1898–1951), former Mayor of Ottawa 
Grenville Hair (1931–1968), English footballer
Grenville Johnston (born 1945), British accountant and Territorial Army officer
Grenville Jones (1922–2000), Welsh political consultant and politician
Grenville Kent (born 1965), Australian author and filmmaker
Grenville Kleiser (1868–1953) Canadian author
Grenville Lewis (1875–1964), American college football coach and businessman
Grenville Mellen (1799–1841), American poet and lawyer
Grenville Millington (born 1951), Welsh footballer
Grenville Morris (1877–1959), Welsh footballer
Grenville Pinto, Canadian violinist
Grenville Turner (born 1936) British physicist
Grenville Wilson (born 1932), English cricketer
Grenville Dean Wilson (1833–1897), American pianist and composer
Grenville Lindall Winthrop (1864–1943), American lawyer and art collector

Places

Australia
 Cape Grenville, Queensland, Australia
 County of Grenville, Victoria, Australia
 Electoral district of Grenville, Victoria, Australia, 1859–1927
 Shire of Grenville, Victoria, Australia, 1861–1994

Canada
 Grenville, Quebec
 Grenville-sur-la-Rouge, Quebec
 Grenville, Grenville-sur-la-Rouge
 Grenville Channel, a strait on the north coast of British Columbia
 Grenville County, Ontario
 United Counties of Leeds and Grenville
 Grenville (electoral district)
 Grenville (provincial electoral district)
 Grenville Parish, Prince Edward Island, Canada
 Grenville Province, a geological region in eastern Canada
 Mount Grenville, British Columbia

Grenada
 Grenville, Grenada
 Grenville River

United States
 Grenville, New Mexico
 Grenville, South Dakota
 Point Grenville, a headland of Washington State

Other uses 
 Grenville Christian College, Ontario, Canada
 Grenville College, former boarding school in Devon, England
 Grenville College, Ballarat, former private school in Australia
 Grenville orogeny, geological mountain-building event
 Grenville Secondary School, Grenada
 , several Royal Navy ships
 Grenville House, residential complex in Hong Kong
 The Two Mrs. Grenvilles, 1987 television miniseries

See also 
 
 Granville (disambiguation)
 Greenville (disambiguation)
 Grenvillite, a name given to several British political factionalists 

English-language surnames